Gerolamo Ragazzoni or Gerolamo Regazzoni (1537 – 5 March 1592) was an Italian renaissance humanist and Roman Catholic prelate who served as Bishop of Bergamo (1577–1592),
Apostolic Nuncio to France (1583–1586), 
Bishop of Novara (1576–1577), 
Apostolic Administrator of Kisamos (1572–1576), 
Coadjutor Bishop of Famagusta (1561),
and Titular Bishop of Nazianzus (1561).

Biography
Gerolamo Ragazzoni was born in Venice, Italy in 1537.
On 15 January 1561, he was appointed during the papacy of Pope Pius IV as Titular Bishop of Nazianzus and Coadjutor Bishop of Famagusta. 
On 10 December 1572, he was appointed during the papacy of Pope Gregory XIII as Apostolic Administrator of Kisamos after the Ottoman conquest of Cyprus in 1570.
On 19 September 1576, he was appointed during the papacy of Pope Gregory XIII as Bishop of Novara. 
On 19 July 1577, he was appointed during the papacy of Pope Gregory XIII as Bishop of Bergamo. 
In 1583, he was appointed during the papacy of Pope Gregory XIII as Apostolic Nuncio to France. 
In 1586, he resigned as Apostolic Nuncio to France. 
He served as Bishop of Bergamo until his death on 5 March 1592.

Works

Episcopal succession
While bishop, he was the principal consecrator of:
François de La Rochefoucauld, Bishop of Clermont (1585); 
Guillaume Rose, Bishop of Senlis (1584); 
and the principal co-consecrator of:
Alessandro Maria Sauli, Bishop of Aleria (1570), 
Giovanni Fontana, Coadjutor Bishop of Ferrara (1589
Alberto Valier, Titular Bishop of Famagusta and Coadjutor Bishop of Verona (1591).

References

External links and additional sources

 (for Chronology of Bishops) 
 (for Chronology of Bishops) 
 (for Chronology of Bishops) 
 (for Chronology of Bishops) 
 (for Chronology of Bishops) 
 (for Chronology of Bishops) 
 (for Chronology of Bishops) 
 (for Chronology of Bishops) 
 (for Chronology of Bishops) 
 (for Chronology of Bishops) 

16th-century Roman Catholic bishops in the Republic of Venice
Bishops appointed by Pope Pius IV
Bishops appointed by Pope Gregory XIII
1537 births
1592 deaths
Bishops of Bergamo